The Dome of the Rock is an Islamic shrine located on the Temple Mount in the Old City of Jerusalem, a site also known to Muslims as the al-Haram al-Sharif or the Al-Aqsa Compound. The original dome collapsed in 1015 and was rebuilt in 1022–23. The Dome of the Rock is the world's oldest surviving work of Islamic architecture.

Its architecture and mosaics were patterned after nearby Byzantine churches and palaces, although its outside appearance was significantly changed during the Ottoman period and again in the modern period, notably with the addition of the gold-plated roof, in 1959–61 and again in 1993. The octagonal plan of the structure may have been influenced by the Byzantine-era Church of the Seat of Mary (also known as Kathisma in Greek and al-Qadismu in Arabic), which was built between 451 and 458 on the road between Jerusalem and Bethlehem.

The Foundation Stone (or Noble Rock) that the temple was built over bears great significance in the Abrahamic religions as the place where God created the world as well as the first human, Adam. It is also believed to be the site where Abraham attempted to sacrifice his son, and as the place where God's divine presence is manifested more than in any other place, towards which Jews turn during prayer. The site's great significance for Muslims derives from traditions connecting it to the creation of the world and the belief that the Night Journey of Muhammad began from the rock at the centre of the structure.

Designated by UNESCO as a World Heritage Site, it has been called "Jerusalem's most recognizable landmark" along with two nearby Old City structures: the Western Wall and the "Resurrection Rotunda" in the Church of the Holy Sepulchre. It is the earliest archaeologically attested religious structure to be built by a Muslim ruler and the building's inscriptions contain the earliest epigraphic proclamations of Islam and of the Islamic prophet Muhammad; the inscriptions proved to be a milestone, as afterward they became a common feature in Islamic structures and almost always mention Muhammad. The Dome of the Rock remains a "unique monument of Islamic culture in almost all respects", including as a "work of art and as a cultural and pious document", according to historian Oleg Grabar.

Description

Basic structure

The structure is basically octagonal.

Surrounding this circle is an octagonal arcade of 24 piers and columns. The octagonal arcade and the inner circular drum create an inner ambulatorium that encircles the holy rock.

The outer walls are also octagonal. The outer and inner octagon create a second, outer ambulatorium surrounding the inner one.

Both the circular drum and the exterior walls contain many windows.

Interior decoration
The interior of the dome is lavishly decorated with mosaic, faience and marble, much of which was added several centuries after its completion. It also contains Qur'anic inscriptions. They vary from today's standard text (mainly changes from the first to the third person) and are mixed with pious inscriptions not in the Quran.

The dedicatory inscription in Kufic script placed around the dome contains the date believed to be the year the Dome was first completed, AH 72 (691/2 CE), while the name of the corresponding caliph and builder of the Dome, al-Malik, was deleted and replaced by the name of Abbasid caliph Al-Ma'mun (r. 813–833) during whose reign renovations took place.

Exterior decoration
The decoration of the outer walls went through two major phases: the initial Umayyad scheme comprised marble and mosaics, much like the interior walls. Sixteenth-century Ottoman sultan Suleyman the Magnificent replaced it with Turkish faience tiles. The Ottoman tile decoration was replaced in the 1960s with faithful copies produced in Italy.

Surah Ya Sin (the 'Heart of the Quran') is inscribed across the top of the tile work and was commissioned in the 16th century by Suleiman the Magnificent. Al-Isra, the Surah 17 which tells the story of the Isra or Night Journey, is inscribed above this.

History

Pre-Islamic background

The Dome of the Rock is situated in the center of the Temple Mount, the site of Solomon's Temple and the Second Jewish Temple, which had been greatly expanded under Herod the Great in the 1st century BCE. Herod's Temple was destroyed in 70 CE by the Romans, and after the Bar Kokhba revolt in 135 CE, a Roman temple to Jupiter Capitolinus was built at the site by Emperor Hadrian.

Jerusalem was ruled by the Byzantine Empire throughout the 4th to 6th centuries. During this time, Christian pilgrimage to Jerusalem began to develop. The Church of the Holy Sepulchre was built under Constantine in the 320s, but the Temple Mount was left undeveloped after a failed project of restoration of the Jewish Temple under Julian the Apostate.

In 638 CE, Byzantine Jerusalem was conquered by the Arab armies of Umar ibn al-Khattab, second Caliph of the Rashidun Caliphate. Umar was advised by Ka'b al-Ahbar, a Jewish rabbi who converted to Islam, that the site is identical with the site of the former Jewish Temples in Jerusalem. Among the first Muslims, Jerusalem was referred to as Madinat bayt al-Maqdis ("City of the Temple").

Umayyads

Original construction
The initial octagonal structure of the Dome of the Rock and its round wooden dome had basically the same shape as it does today. It was built by the order of the Umayyad caliph Abd al-Malik. According to Sibt ibn al-Jawzi (1185–1256), construction started in 685/86, while al-Suyuti (1445–1505) holds that its commencement year was 688. A dedicatory inscription in Kufic script is preserved inside the dome. The date is recorded as AH 72 (691/2 CE), the year most historians believe the construction of the original Dome was completed. An alternative interpretation of the inscription claims that it indicates the year when construction started. In this inscription, the name of "al-Malik" was deleted and replaced by the name of the Abbasid caliph al-Ma'mun. This alteration of the original inscription was first noted by Melchior de Vogüé in 1864. Some scholars have suggested that the dome was added to an existing building, built either by Muawiyah I (r. 661–680), or indeed a Byzantine building dating to before the Muslim conquest, built under Heraclius (r. 610–641).

The Dome of the Rock's architecture and mosaics were patterned after nearby Byzantine churches and palaces. The supervisor and engineer in charge of the project were Raja ibn Haywa, Yazid ibn Salam, and the latter's son Baha. Raja was a Muslim theologian and native of Beisan, and Yazid and Baha were mawali (non-Arab, Muslim converts; clients) of Abd al-Malik from Jerusalem. Abd al-Malik was represented in the supervision of the construction by his son Sa'id al-Khayr. The Caliph employed expert works from across his domain, at the time restricted to Syria and Egypt, who were presumably Christians. Construction cost was reportedly seven times the yearly tax income of Egypt. The historian K. A. C. Creswell noted that those who built the shrine used the measurements of the Church of the Holy Sepulchre.

Motivations for construction
Narratives by the medieval sources about Abd al-Malik's motivations in building the Dome of the Rock vary. At the time of its construction, the Caliph was engaged in war with Christian Byzantium and its Syrian Christian allies on the one hand and with the rival caliph Abd Allah ibn al-Zubayr, who controlled Mecca, the annual destination of Muslim pilgrimage, on the other hand. Thus, one series of explanations was that Abd al-Malik intended for the Dome of the Rock to be a religious monument of victory over the Christians that would distinguish Islam's uniqueness within the common Abrahamic religious setting of Jerusalem, home of the two older Abrahamic faiths, Judaism and Christianity. The historian Shelomo Dov Goitein has argued that the Dome of the Rock was intended to compete with the many fine buildings of worship of other religions: "The very form of a rotunda, given to the Qubbat as-Sakhra, although it was foreign to Islam, was destined to rival the many Christian domes."

The other main explanation holds that Abd al-Malik, in the heat of the war with Ibn al-Zubayr, sought to build the structure to divert the focus of the Muslims in his realm from the Ka'aba in Mecca, where Ibn al-Zubayr would publicly condemn the Umayyads during the annual pilgrimage to the sanctuary. Though most modern historians dismiss the latter account as a product of anti-Umayyad propaganda in the traditional Muslim sources and doubt that Abd al-Malik would attempt to alter the sacred Muslim requirement of fulfilling the pilgrimage to the Ka'aba, other historians concede that this cannot be conclusively dismissed.

Abbasids and Fatimids
The building was severely damaged by earthquakes in 808 and again in 846. The dome collapsed in an earthquake in 1015 and was rebuilt in 1022–23. The mosaics on the drum were repaired in 1027–28. The earthquake of 1033 resulted in the introduction of wooden beams to enforce the dome.

Crusaders

For centuries Christian pilgrims were able to come and experience the Temple Mount, but escalating violence against pilgrims to Jerusalem (Al-Hakim bi-Amr Allah, who ordered the destruction of the Holy Sepulchre, was an example) resulted in the Crusades. The Crusaders captured Jerusalem in 1099 and the Dome of the Rock was given to the Augustinians, who turned it into a church, while the nearby Jami'a Al-Aqsa first became a royal palace for a while, and then for much of the 12th century the headquarters of the Knights Templar. The Templars, active from c. 1119, identified the Dome of the Rock as the site of the Temple of Solomon. The Templum Domini, as they called the Dome of the Rock, featured on the official seals of the Order's Grand Masters (such as Everard des Barres and Renaud de Vichiers), and soon became the architectural model for round Templar churches across Europe.

Ayyubids and Mamluks

Jerusalem was recaptured by Saladin on 2 October 1187, and the Dome of the Rock was reconsecrated as a Muslim shrine. The cross on top of the dome was replaced by a crescent, and a wooden screen was placed around the rock below. Saladin's nephew al-Malik al-Mu'azzam Isa carried out other restorations within the building, and added the porch to the Jami'a Al-Aqsa.

The Dome of the Rock was the focus of extensive royal patronage by the sultans during the Mamluk period, which lasted from 1260 until 1516.

Ottoman period (1517–1917)
During the reign of Suleiman the Magnificent (1520–1566), the exterior of the Dome of the Rock was covered with tiles. This work took seven years. Some of the interior decoration was added in the Ottoman period.

Adjacent to the Dome of the Rock, the Ottomans built the free-standing Dome of the Prophet in 1620.

Large-scale renovation was undertaken during the reign of Mahmud II in 1817. In a major restoration project undertaken in 1874–75 during the reign of the Ottoman Sultan Abdülaziz, all the tiles on the west and southwest walls of the octagonal part of the building were removed and replaced by copies that had been made in Turkey.

British Mandate

Haj Amin al-Husseini, appointed Grand Mufti by the British in 1917, along with Yaqub al-Ghusayn, implemented the restoration of the Dome of the Rock and the Jami Al-Aqsa in Jerusalem.

Parts of the Dome of the Rock collapsed during the 11 July 1927 earthquake, and the walls were left badly cracked, damaging many of the repairs that had taken place over previous years.

Jordanian rule
In 1955, an extensive program of renovation was begun by the government of Jordan, with funds supplied by Arab governments and Turkey. The work included replacement of large numbers of tiles dating back to the reign of Suleiman the Magnificent, which had become dislodged by heavy rain. In 1965, as part of this restoration, the dome was covered with a durable aluminium bronze alloy made in Italy that replaced the lead exterior. Before 1959, the dome was covered in blackened lead. In the course of substantial restoration carried out from 1959 to 1962, the lead was replaced by aluminum-bronze plates covered with gold leaf.

Israeli rule

A few hours after the Israeli flag was hoisted over the Dome of the Rock in 1967 during the Six-Day War, Israelis lowered it on the orders of Moshe Dayan and invested the Muslim waqf (religious trust) with the authority to manage the Temple Mount in order to "keep the peace".

In 1993, the golden dome covering was refurbished following a donation of US$8.25 million by King Hussein of Jordan, who sold one of his houses in London to fund the 80 kilograms of gold required.

Depictions in modern time
The Dome of the Rock has been depicted on the Obverse and reverse of several Middle East currencies:

Accessibility

The Dome is maintained by the Ministry of Awqaf in Amman, Jordan.

Until the mid-20th century, non-Muslims were not permitted in the area. Since 1967, non-Muslims have been permitted limited access; however non-Muslims are not permitted to pray on the Temple Mount, bring prayer books, or wear religious apparel. The Israeli police help enforce this. Israel restricted access for a short time during 2012 of Palestinian residents of the West Bank to the Temple Mount. West Bank Palestinian men had to be over 35 to be eligible for a permit. Palestinian residents of Jerusalem, who hold Israeli residency cards, and Palestinians with Israeli citizenship are permitted unrestricted access.

Some Orthodox rabbis encourage Jews to visit the site, while most forbid entry to the compound lest there be a violation of Jewish law. Even rabbis who encourage entrance to the Temple Mount prohibit entrance to the actual Dome of the Rock.

Religious significance

The location of the Dome of the Rock is believed by many Muslims to be the site mentioned in Sura 17 of the Qur'an, which tells the story of the Isra and Mi'raj, the miraculous Night Journey of Prophet Muhammad from the Great Mosque of Mecca to the Masjid Al-Aqsa ('"the farthest place of prayer") where he prayed, and then to visit heaven where he leads prayers and rises to heaven to receive instructions from Allah. Although the city of Jerusalem is not mentioned by any of its names in the Qur'an, it is mentioned in hadiths as the place of Muhammad's Night Journey.

Judging though by the early Muslim sources, this doesn't seem to have been yet a fully formulated part of the beliefs shared by Muslims during the construction of the Dome in the 8th century, and the inscriptions inside the dome attributing the building to Caliph 'Abd al-Malik in the year 691/2 do not refer at all to the Night Journey, but contain only the Quranic view on the nature of the prophet Isa (Jesus) instead. The inscription is in a mosaic frieze that includes an explicit rejection of the divinity of Christ:

According to Goitein, the inscriptions decorating the interior clearly display a spirit of polemic against Christianity, whilst stressing at the same time the Qur'anic doctrine that Jesus was a true prophet. The formula la sharika lahu ("God has no companion") is repeated five times; the verses from Sura Maryam 19:35–37, which strongly reaffirm Jesus' prophethood to God, are quoted together with the prayer: Allahumma salli ala rasulika wa'abdika 'Isa bin Maryam – "O Lord, send your blessings to your Prophet and Servant Jesus son of Mary." He believes that this shows that rivalry with Christendom, together with the spirit of Muslim mission to the Christians, was at work at the time of construction.

At the beginning of the 8th century, Ibn Ishaq codified the earliest Arabic source pertaining to the Jerusalem Rock, as part of his Sirat al-Nabi, a biography of the Islamic prophet Muhammad, introducing the notion that right after the Prophet's Night Journey from Mecca to Jerusalem (isra'''), he set off immediately and specifically from the Rock in his Ascension (mi'raj) to Heaven, where God instructed him in the doctrines of the new religion.

Today, many Muslims believe the Dome serves for the commemoration of the Prophet's Ascension, in accordance to the views shared by some Islamic scholars, that the Rock is indeed the spot from which Muhammad ascended to Heaven accompanied by the angel Gabriel. Further, Muhammad was taken here by Gabriel to pray with Abraham, Moses, and Jesus.
Other Islamic scholars believe that the Prophet ascended to Heaven from the Masjid Al-Aqsa, of which the Dome of the Rock is a part.

In traditional Jewish sources, it is believed to be the place from which the creation of the world began. Moreover, many Jews believe the site to be where Abraham prepared to sacrifice his son Isaac. The Foundation Stone and its surroundings which lie at the center of the dome, are considered the holiest site in Judaism. Jews traditionally regard the location of the stone as the holiest spot on Earth, the site of the Holy of Holies of the First and the Second Temple. 

Though Muslims now pray towards the Kaaba at Mecca, they once faced the Temple Mount as the Jews do; Islamic tradition holds that Muhammad led prayers towards Jerusalem until the 16th or 17th month after his migration from Mecca to Medina, when Allah directed him to instead turn towards the Kaaba in Mecca.

The Temple Institute wishes to relocate the Dome to another site and replace it with a Third Temple. Many Israelis are ambivalent about the Movement's wishes. Some religious Jews, following rabbinic teaching, believe that the Temple should only be rebuilt in the messianic era, and that it would be presumptuous of people to force God's hand. However, some Evangelical Christians consider rebuilding of the Temple to be a prerequisite to Armageddon and the Second Coming. Jeremy Gimpel, a US-born candidate for The Jewish Home political party in the 2013 Israeli elections, caused a controversy when he was recorded telling a Fellowship Church evangelical group in Florida in 2011 to imagine the incredible experience that would follow were the Dome to be destroyed and the construction of the Third Temple begun. All evangelicals would immediately rush to go to Israel, he opined.

Architectural homages
The Dome of the Rock has inspired the architecture of a number of buildings. These include the octagonal Church of St. Giacomo in Italy, the Mausoleum of Sultan Suleiman the Magnificent in Istanbul, the octagonal Moorish Revival style Rumbach Street Synagogue in Budapest, and the New Synagogue in Berlin, Germany. It was long believed by Christians that the Dome of the Rock echoed the architecture of the Temple in Jerusalem, as can be seen in Raphael's The Marriage of the Virgin and in Perugino's Marriage of the Virgin.

Images

See also

 Ablaq
 History of medieval Arabic and Western European domes
 List of the oldest mosques in the world
 New Jerusalem
 Temple in Jerusalem
 Well of Souls

References
Citations

Works cited
 
 Peterson, Andrew (1994). Dictionary of Islamic Architecture. London: Routledge. 
 Braswell, G. (1996). Islam – Its Prophets, People, Politics and Power. Nashville, TN: Broadman and Holman Publishers.
 
 
 
 
 
 
 
 
 Ali, A. (1946). The Holy Qur’an – Translation and Commentary. Bronx, NY: Islamic Propagation Centre International.
 
 Christoph Luxenberg: Neudeutung der arabischen Inschrift im Felsendom zu Jerusalem. In: Karl-Heinz Ohlig / Gerd-R. Puin (Hg.): Die dunklen Anfänge. Neue Forschungen zur Entstehung und frühen Geschichte des Islam, Berlin (Verlag Hans Schiler) 2005, S. 124–147. English version: "A New Interpretation of the Arabic Inscription in Jerusalem's Dome of the Rock". In: Karl-Heinz Ohlig / Gerd-R. Puin (eds.): The Hidden Origins of Islam: New Research into Its Early History'', Amherst, N.Y. (Prometheus Books) 2010

Further reading

External links

 
 Dome of the Rock Sacred sites
 The Dome of the Rock in Jerusalem Masterpieces of Islamic Architecture
 
 

Mosque buildings with domes
7th-century mosques
Arabic architecture
Castles and fortifications of the Knights Templar
Islamic architecture
Islam in Jerusalem
Octagonal buildings
Shrines in Jerusalem
Temple Mount
Tiling
Umayyad architecture in the State of Palestine
Entering heaven alive
7th-century establishments in the Umayyad Caliphate
Mosques completed in 691